Kristine Minde ( Wigdahl Hegland; born 8 August 1992) is a Norwegian footballer who plays for Rosenborg BK of the Norwegian Toppserien, having previously played for Arna-Bjørnar in her native Norway. She has represented the Norway women's national football team since 2011 and featured at the 2011 and 2015 FIFA Women's World Cups, as well as UEFA Women's Euro 2013.

Personal life
In November 2013, she got married and took her husband's name, becoming Kristine Minde.

Club career
Born in Bergen, Minde joined Arna-Bjørnar as a 14-year-old and developed into an important player at the club. After playing for Norway in UEFA Women's Euro 2013 she became a transfer target for bigger teams in Sweden and Germany. She was sold to Linköpings ahead of the 2014 Damallsvenskan season. Arna-Bjørnar did not reveal the size of the transfer fee, but said the extra income would come in handy.

In June 2020, she signed a 2-year contract with Norwegian Rosenborg BK, valid from 1 August 2020.

Honours 
Linköpings FC
Winner
 Damallsvenskan: 2016, 2017
 Svenska Cupen (1): 2014–15

Runner-up
 Svenska Supercupen: 2015

Career statistics

International career
At youth level Minde was captain of Norway's under-19 national team and played at the 2008 FIFA U-20 Women's World Cup.

Uncapped Minde was a late call-up to the Norway squad for the 2011 FIFA Women's World Cup, following Lisa-Marie Woods' withdrawal with a hip injury. She made her debut at the tournament, in Norway's final group match; a 2–1 defeat by Australia.

National coach Even Pellerud named Minde in his squad for the 2013 European Championships in Sweden. In Norway's opening fixture, Minde put her team ahead against Iceland, only for Margrét Lára Viðarsdóttir to equalise with a late penalty kick. Minde played 120 minutes in the semi-final victory over Denmark and 90 minutes in the final against Germany, as Norway finished with silver medals.

She made her 100th appearance for Norway on 17 June 2019, during the 2019 FIFA Women's World Cup.

References

External links

 
 
 
  
 
 

1992 births
Living people
Footballers from Bergen
Norwegian women's footballers
Women's association football midfielders
Women's association football forwards

Arna-Bjørnar players
Linköpings FC players
VfL Wolfsburg (women) players
Rosenborg BK Kvinner players

Toppserien players
Damallsvenskan players
Frauen-Bundesliga players

Norwegian expatriate women's footballers
Expatriate women's footballers in Germany
Norwegian expatriate sportspeople in Germany
Expatriate women's footballers in Sweden
Norwegian expatriate sportspeople in Sweden

Norway women's youth international footballers
Norway women's international footballers
2011 FIFA Women's World Cup players
2015 FIFA Women's World Cup players
2019 FIFA Women's World Cup players
FIFA Century Club
UEFA Women's Euro 2017 players